John T. Hamilton (born March 1, 1963, Bronx, NY) is a literary scholar, musician, and William R. Kenan Professor of German and Comparative Literature at Harvard University. He previously held positions at the University of California-Santa Cruz (in Classics) and New York University (Comparative Literature and German). He has also taught as a visiting professor at the Institute of Greece, Rome, and the Classical Tradition at Bristol University. Numerous academic fellowships include the Wissenschaftskolleg zu Berlin, the ETH-Zürich, and the Zentrum für Literatur- und Kulturforschung Berlin.

Hamilton received his doctorate in Comparative Literature at New York University in 1999 under the directorship of Richard Sieburth. Hamilton's primary teaching and research topics include 18th- and 19th-century Literature, Classical Philology and Reception History, Music and Literature, Literary Theory and Political Metaphorology.

In Soliciting Darkness: Pindar, Obscurity, and the Classical Tradition (2004), Hamilton offers a broad investigation of Pindar, the archaic Greek lyric poet, and his long reception history in European literature and scholarship, addressing a variety of pressing issues, including the recovery and appropriation of classical texts, problems of translation, representations of lyric authenticity, and the possibility or impossibility of a continuous literary tradition. The poetics of obscurity that comes to be articulated across the centuries suggests that taking Pindar to be an incomprehensible poet may not simply be the result of an insufficient or false reading, but rather may serve as a wholly adequate judgment.

Hamilton's subsequent book, Music, Madness, and the Unworking of Language (2008) grapples with Romantic figurations of the mad musician, which challenge the limits of representation and thereby instigate a profound crisis in language. Special attention is given to the decidedly autobiographical impulse of the late eighteenth and early nineteenth centuries, where musical experience and mental disturbance disrupt the expression of referential thought, illuminating the irreducible aspects of the self before language can work them back into a discursive system.

Security: Politics, Humanity, and the Philology of Care (2013) examines the discursive versatility and semantic vagueness of the term security both in current and historical usage. Adopting a philological approach, Hamilton explores the fundamental ambiguity of this word, which denotes the removal of "concern" or "care" and therefore implies a condition that is either carefree or careless. Spanning texts from ancient Greek poetry to Roman Stoicism, from Augustine and Luther to Machiavelli and Hobbes, from Kant and Nietzsche to Heidegger and Carl Schmitt, the study analyzes formulations of security that involve both safety and negligence, confidence and complacency, certitude and ignorance.

Hamilton's Philology of the Flesh (2018) reflects on the poetic implications and ramifications of the incarnational metaphor, whereby the Word is said to become flesh. By pressing the notion of philology as “love” (philia) for the “word” (logos), Hamilton's readings investigate the breadth, depth, and limits of verbal styles that are irreducible to mere information. While a philologist of the body might understand words as corporeal vessels of core meaning, the philologist of the flesh, by focusing on the carnal qualities of language, resists taking words as mere containers. Textual analyses include readings of Lorenzo Valla, Johann Georg Hamann and Immanuel Kant, Friedrich Nietzsche, Franz Kafka, Emily Dickinson and Paul Celan.

From 1985 to 1996 Hamilton was the guitarist and principal songwriter, together with Donna Croughn, for the band Tiny Lights, based in Hoboken, New Jersey.

Books 

Soliciting Darkness: Pindar, Obscurity, and the Classical Tradition (Cambridge: Harvard University Press, 2004), . According to WorldCat, the book is held in 257 libraries Translated into Chinese, by Lin Lou, as 幽暗的诱惑 : 品达、晦涩与古典传统 / You an de you huo : Pindar, hui se yu gu dian chuan tong 
Music, Madness, and the Unworking of Language (New York: Columbia University Press, 2008),  According to WorldCat, the book is held in 449 libraries. Translated into German as Musik, Wahnsinn und das Ausserkraftsetzen der Sprache (2011) 
Security: Politics, Humanity, and the Philology of Care (Princeton: Princeton University Press, 2013)  According to WorldCat, the book is held in 749 libraries.
Philology of the Flesh (Chicago: University of Chicago Press, 2018) 
Über die Selbstgefälligkeit (Berlin: Matthes & Seitz, 2021)

Selected articles 

“Poetica obscura: Reexamining Hamann’s Contribution to the Pindaric Tradition,” Eighteenth-Century Studies 34:1 (2000), 93-115.
“Temple du Temps: Valéry et le Verbe opaque” in Poétiques de l’objet: L’Objet dans la poésie française du Moyen Âge au XXe siècle, François Rouget, ed. Paris : Champion, 2001, 155–64.
“Thunder from a Clear Sky: On Lessing’s Redemption of Horace” Modern Language Quarterly 62:3 (2001), 203–218.
“Modernity, Translation, and Poetic Prose in Lessing’s Briefe, die neueste Literatur betreffend,” Lessing Jahrbuch 36 (2004/2005), 79–96. 
“Canis canens, oder Kafkas Respekt vor der Musikwissenschaft,” Kafkas Institutionen, Arne Höcker and Oliver Simons, ed., Bielefeld: Transcript, 2007, 145–156.
“Philology and Music in the Work of Pascal Quignard,” Studies in Twentieth- and Twenty-first-Century Literature 33 (2009), 43–67.
“Music on Location: Rhythm, Resonance, and Romanticism in Eichendorff’s Marmorbild,” Modern Language Quarterly 70 (2009): 195–221.
“Ovids Echographie” in Narziss und Eros. Bild oder Text?, Eckart Goebel and Elisabeth Bronfen, ed., Göttingen: Wallstein, 2009, 18–40.
“O mi fili, o mi discipule! Der Vater als Philosophiemeister im alten Rom,” Meister und Schüler in Geschichte und Gegenwart: Von Religionen der Antike bis zur modernen Esoterik, A.-B. Renger, ed., Göttingen: V&R Unipress, 2012, 69–80. 
“Reception, Gratitude and Obligation: Lessing and the Classical Tradition,” Studies in Voltaire and the Eighteenth Century (2013), 81–96. 
“Der pythogoreische Kult und die akousmatische Mitteilung von Wissen,” Performanz von Wissen: Strategien der Wissensvermittlung in der Vormoderne, T. Fuhrer and A.-B. Renger, ed., Heidelberg: Winter, 2013, 49–54.
“Gambara de Balzac, ou Le Chef-d’œuvre ‘inentendu’: pour une esthétique noétique,” in Théories de la littérature: nouveaux éléments de vocabulaire, Emmanuel Bouju, ed. (Rennes, 2015). 
“Repetitio Sententiarum, Repetitio Verborum: Kant, Hamann, and the Implications of Citation,” German Quarterly 87:3 (2014), 297–312. 
“Omnia mea mecum porto: Exile, Culture, and the Precarity of Life,” Ethos Quarterly 108 (2014), 95–107. 
“Ellipses of World Literature,” Poetica 46 (2014), 1–16. 
"Cléopâtre pour Cléopâtre: Das innere Absolute und die Wiederbelebung der Zivilisation in Gautiers Une nuit de Cléopâtre" in Translatio Babylonis: Unsere orientalische Moderne, Barbara Vinken, ed. Paderborn: Fink, 2014.
“Procuratores: On the Limits of Caring for Another,” Telos 170 (2015), 1–16. 
“Torture as an Instrument of Music,” in Liminal Auralities: Sounds, Technics, and Space, Sander van Maas, ed. New York: Fordham University Press, 2015, 143–52. 
“‘Cette douceur, pour ainsi dire wagnérienne’: Musical Resonance in Proust's Recherche” in Proust and the Arts, Christie McDonald and François Proulx, ed., Cambridge: Cambridge University Press, 2015, 90–100.
“Rahmen, Küsten, und Nachhaltigkeiten in Theodor Storms Der Schimmelreiter,” Weimarer Beiträge (2015), 165–80. 
“Voluptas Carnis: Allegory and Non-Knowledge in Pieter Aertsen’s Paintings,” in Ignorance, Nescience, Nonknowledge, Cornel Zwierlein, ed., Leiden: Brill, 2016, 179–96. 
“Cross against Corslet: Elgar, Longfellow, and the Saga of King Olaf,” Elgar Society Journal 21 (2018), 1–15.
“Carmina carnis: Der rote Ursprung der lebendigen Sprache bei Hölderlin” in Körper/Zeichen, Sophie Witt, ed. Special edition of figurationen: gender – literatur – kultur 19:2 (2018)

References 

Jared Lucky, "Schoolhouse Rock," The Harvard Crimson (May 4, 2012)
Scott Schinder and Scott Frampton, "Tiny Lights," Trouser Press (www.trouserpress.com/entry.php?a=tiny_lights)

External links 
John Hamilton's Faculty Page, Department of Comparative Literature, Harvard University
Sigmund H. Danziger, Jr. Memorial Lecture in the Humanities, The University of Chicago, February 2014
Presentation at Great New Books in the Humanities, hosted by the Humanities Initiative, NYU
Presentation on the Philology of the Flesh at Utrecht University, May 2012

1963 births
Harvard University faculty
Harvard University Department of German faculty
Professors of German in the United States
Living people
People from the Bronx
American rock guitarists
Tiny Lights members
Harvard Extension School faculty